Baydaratskaya Bay or Baydarata Bay (Tundra Nenets: Пэдарита, Pėdarita) is a gulf in Russia, located in the southern part of the Kara Sea between the coastline of the Polar Urals, the northern end of the Ural Mountains, and Yamal Peninsula. The length of the gulf is approx. 180 km, mouth width - 78 km, depth - up to 20 m.

Surface water temperature is 5-6C during summertime. The gulf freezes up during winter. The rivers Baydarata, Yuribey, Kara, and some others flow into the Baydarata Bay.

The gulf contains the following larger islands: Torasovey Island, Litke Island, and Levdiyev Island.

The Yamal-Center gas pipeline is laid by Gazprom on the seabed across the bay from rich gas deposits of the Yamal.

References

External links
Breeding conditions for waders in Russian tundras in 1993 P.S. Tomkovich
A description of the Baydaraka Gulf in the context of the construction of a gas pipeline—

Gulfs of the Kara Sea
Gulfs of Russia
Bodies of water of Nenets Autonomous Okrug
Bodies of water of Yamalo-Nenets Autonomous Okrug